Abdul Latif Dayfallah (1 January 1930 – 27 March 2019) was a Yemeni military officer and politician. He was born in Ibb Governorate. He joined the Yemeni Army and received military training at the Egyptian Military Academy in Cairo where he acquired Nasserist sympathies. At the time of the September 1962 coup, he held the rank of Major General and served as Director of Signals in the Yemeni military. He was the Prime Minister of the Yemen Arab Republic from 26 April to 5 October 1963, under President Abdullah as-Sallal. Dayfallah also served as acting prime minister for nine days in January 1975. Dayfallah died in March 2019 at the age of 89.

References

1930 births
2019 deaths
Prime Ministers of North Yemen
People from Ibb Governorate
Egyptian Military Academy alumni
Yemeni military officers
20th-century Yemeni politicians
20th-century Yemeni military personnel
Free Officers Organization (Yemen)